Deloli is a village in the Mahesana district of Gujarat, in western India.

History 
Deloli was a petty princely state comprising only the village in Mahi Kantha Agency and ruled by Koli caste's chieftains.

Deloli had a population of 800 in 1901, yielding a state revenue of about 3,095 rupees (which is about equal to 41.52 dollars) (1903–1904, nearly all from land), paying a tribute of 256 Rupees to the Gaikwar Baroda State.

References

External links 
 Imperial Gazetteer on DSAL – Mahi Kantha

Villages in Mehsana district
Princely states of Gujarat